David Jonathan Noble (born 8 November 1982) is an English former first-class cricketer.

Noble was born at Manchester in November 1982. He was educated at Rugby School, before going up to Emmanuel College, Cambridge to study medicine. While studying at Cambridge, he played first-class cricket for Cambridge University from 2002–04, making three appearances against Oxford University in The University Match. In addition to playing for Cambridge University, he also made three first-class appearances for Cambridge UCCE in 2002 against Middlesex, Essex and Surrey. He scored 94 runs in his six first-class matches, with a high score of 21. With his right-arm medium-fast bowling, he took 9 wickets with best figures of 3 for 66. After graduating from Cambridge, he became a clinical oncologist.

Notes and references

External links

1982 births
Living people
Cricketers from Manchester
People educated at Rugby School
Alumni of Emmanuel College, Cambridge
English cricketers
Cambridge MCCU cricketers
Cambridge University cricketers
21st-century English medical doctors
English oncologists